Hachettea austrocaledonica is a species of parasitic plant in the Balanophoraceae family. It is endemic to New Caledonia and the only species of the genus Hachettea. Its closest relative is Dactylanthus from New Zealand.

References

Endemic flora of New Caledonia
Balanophoraceae
Monotypic Santalales genera
Taxa named by Henri Ernest Baillon